WORB (90.3 FM) was a non-commercial, college radio station located on the campus of Oakland Community College in Farmington Hills, Michigan United States.  WORB was a student-run radio station that featured alternative rock music as well as specialty shows. Staff, volunteers, and DJs for the station were made up of Oakland Community College students, and faculty. Cult shock rocker GG Allin was even interviewed on one show, which led to an investigation by the college and the FCC. The station ceased broadcasting on September 22, 1999.

References

External links
Oakland Community College

ORB
Defunct radio stations in the United States
Radio stations established in 1976
Radio stations disestablished in 1999
1976 establishments in Michigan
1999 disestablishments in Michigan
ORB